Western Leone is a Western-style theme park in the province of Almeria, Andalusia (Spain). Located at the 378.9 km mark on the A-92 motorway, it is the smallest of three such theme parks in the Tabernas Desert; the other two are Mini Hollywood and Texas Hollywood. Western Leone was originally built to film Sergio Leone's Once Upon a Time in the West (1968); the large red house, around which many of the scenes in the film revolve, is maintained as an attraction, along with other buildings of a Western town. It has also been used to film other Spaghetti Westerns.

In 1970, a fortress was built a short distance from Western Leone. This structure was used as a set for El Condor and later films. The fortress fell into disrepair by 1986.

As for March 2022, it is for sale.

See also

List of films shot in Almeria

References 

Amusement parks in Spain
Buildings and structures in Andalusia
Tourist attractions in Andalusia
Western (genre) theme parks